Biplab Samantray (born 14 December 1988) is an Odia cricketer. He is a right-handed bowler and middle order batsman. In first class cricket, he plays for Odisha in Ranji Trophy. He played and captained Katak Barabati Tigers in Odisha Premier League in the inaugural edition and got the Man of the series award. He has played for the Sunrisers Hyderabad in the IPL. He has already led Odisha to a memorable win against Assam in the third round of the 2015 season. He was also a part of the East zone team which won its first ever Duleep trophy in 2011–2012.

In November 2018, he scored his 3,000th run in first-class cricket, batting for Odisha against Haryana in the 2018–19 Ranji Trophy.

References

1988 births
Living people
East Zone cricketers
Odisha cricketers
Indian cricketers
Sunrisers Hyderabad cricketers
Deccan Chargers cricketers
People from Cuttack
Cricketers from Odisha